The 2021 GT Cup Open Europe was the third season of the GT Cup Open Europe, the grand tourer-style sports car racing series founded by the Spanish GT Sport Organización. It began on 15 May at Paul Ricard and finished on 24 November at the Circuit de Barcelona-Catalunya after five double-header meetings.

Entry List

Race calendar and results 

 A provisional six-round calendar was revealed on 12 January 2021. It represents a return to normalcy after the Coronavirus pandemic forced change in the 2020 season. After being added to the previous year's revised calendar as a replacement round, the Hungaroring was originally dropped from the 2021 schedule in favor of Portimão. Due to a late schedule change for Formula 1 however, this decision was reversed. The other tracks carry over from the previous year, but on different dates.

Championship standings

Points systems 
Points are awarded to the top 10 (Overall) or top 6 (Am, Pro-Am, Teams) classified finishers. If less than 6 participants start the race or if less than 75% of the original race distance is completed, half points are awarded. At the end of the season, the lowest race score is dropped; however, the dropped race cannot be the result of a disqualification or race ban.

Overall

Pro-Am, Am, and Teams

Drivers' championships

Overall

Pro-Am

Am

Teams' Championship 
Only the highest two finishing cars from a team count towards the Teams' Championship

External links 

 Official website

Footnotes

References 

GT Cup Open Europe seasons
GT Cup Open Europe